"Turn Around and Count 2 Ten" is the lead single by British band Dead or Alive from their fourth studio album Nude. Despite that its UK Singles Chart success was limited to the top 100 (#70 peak), the song reached number two in the US Hot Dance Club Songs chart as well as being number one for 17 weeks in Japan.

Two edits were made of the video, one using the single version and one using "The Pearl and Dean "I Had A Disco Dream" Mix”. The "Disco Dream" video is the one used on the band's Evolution: The Hits DVD and on YouTube.

Track listing

UK CD single – 1988, Epic (BURNS C4)
"Turn Around and Count 2 Ten" (7" Version) – 4:52
"Something in My House" (Instru-Mental Mix) – 3:34
"Turn Around and Count 2 Ten" (The Pearl and Dean "I Love" BPM Mix) – 8:38
"Turn Around and Count 2 Ten" (Instru-Mental Mix) – 3:00

Chart performance

References

1988 singles
Dead or Alive (band) songs
Oricon International Singles Chart number-one singles
Songs written by Pete Burns
Songs written by Tim Lever
Songs written by Mike Percy (musician)
1988 songs
Epic Records singles